Solhabad (also Romanized as Şolḩābād and Sāleh Ābād; also known as Şolḩābādū and Sūlhābād) is a village in Qohab-e Rastaq Rural District, Amirabad District, Damghan County, Semnan Province, Iran. At the 2006 census, its population was 54, in 24 families.

References 

Populated places in Damghan County